Paul Anderson (born 19 November 1978) is an English film and television actor who came to prominence for portraying Arthur Shelby Jr. in Peaky Blinders, Mr Anderson in the 2015 film The Revenant, and Sebastian Moran in Sherlock Holmes: A Game of Shadows.

Career 
Anderson decided to pursue acting in the mid 2000s, after working for many years as a ticket scalper and aspiring musician, and enrolled at the Webber Douglas Academy of Dramatic Art. He began his acting career by appearing in plays written by his friend Gregory Burke, and made his screen debut with Burke's critically acclaimed 2014 film '71. He had his first leading role in the 2009 British movie, The Firm.

Anderson's break came when, in 2013, he was cast as a main character in the BBC Two show Peaky Blinders as Arthur Shelby, a gangster in post First World War Birmingham. Since then, Anderson has appeared in many major films, including Ron Howard's In the Heart of the Sea and The Revenant, as well as Brimstone, which was released in 2016.

Personal life 
Anderson is from Kennington, South London.

Filmography

Film

Television

References

External links

English male film actors
Living people
Place of birth missing (living people)
Male actors from London
21st-century English male actors
English male television actors
1978 births